Leonid Fedorovych Toptunov (16 August 1960 – 14 May 1986) was a Soviet engineer who was the senior reactor control chief engineer at the Chernobyl Nuclear Power Plant Reactor Unit 4 on the night of the Chernobyl disaster, 26 April 1986.

Early life
Leonid Toptunov was born on 16 August 1960 in Mykolaivka, Buryn Raion, Sumy Oblast. His father was involved in the Soviet space program and during his childhood, he was surrounded by scientists and engineers.

In 1983, he graduated from the Obninsk Institute for Nuclear Power Engineering, with a specialist degree in nuclear power plant engineering.

Chernobyl 
In March 1983, Toptunov began his career at the Chernobyl Nuclear Power Plant. During his studies of the reactor documentation, he mentioned to his friend, Sasha Korol, that control rods may, in certain circumstances, accelerate rather than slow the reaction. He worked as a unit control engineer and senior reactor control engineer.

On the night of 26 April 1986, Leonid Toptunov was working in the control room at the reactor control panel, with Aleksandr Akimov. Toptunov only had two months' experience in operating the reactor and this was his first shutdown as operator. The operators attempted to perform a rundown test before scheduled routine maintenance, during which reactor 4 exploded. In preparation, Anatoly Dyatlov ordered the power to be reduced to 700 MW, as the test plan stipulated. However, the reactor stalled unexpectedly during test preparations, dropping to a low 30 MW. Raising power after this point put the reactor into a potentially dangerous state, due to Xenon poisoning, as well as design flaws in the reactor unknown to the operators. Dyatlov ordered Toptunov and Akimov to raise the power to the requisite 700 MW. Withdrawing a dangerous number of control rods, the operators could only reach 200 MW due to xenon poisoning. During the test, Akimov called for the AZ-5 (scram) button to be pressed to shut down the reactor, and Toptunov operated the button. Due to a design flaw, the descending control rods momentarily accelerated the nuclear reaction and caused the reactor to explode.

Toptunov, along with non-essential personnel, was dismissed. He left the control room but decided to return out of a sense of responsibility. He worked with Akimov to manually open water valves in an attempt to increase water supply to the reactor, during which time they began to experience symptoms of acute radiation syndrome. They were found by other workers and taken to the infirmary. During the accident, he was exposed to a fatal radiation dose of 1300 rem.

He was admitted to Pripyat Hospital but was quickly transferred to Moscow Hospital 6. By 28 April, the symptoms of radiation sickness had mostly subsided. He sent a letter to his parents and left a note on where to find him in Moscow. His parents visited him in the hospital. Although he could walk, his parents could see he had strange skin damage. During his stay, he discussed possible causes of the accident with Akimov and Dyatlov but they were mystified. His parents once asked about the cause but he only could say they had followed regulations. Toptunov and Akimov received bone marrow transplants in attempt to restore their immune systems. He died from the acute radiation poisoning on 14 May 1986 and was laid to rest at the Mitinskoe Cemetery in Moscow. His family was informed that his death was the only reason he was not prosecuted for the accident.

While the initial Soviet investigation put almost all the blame on the operators and management, later findings by the IAEA found that the reactor design and how the operators were informed of safety information was more significant. However, the operators were found to have deviated from operational procedures, changing test protocols on the fly, as well as having made "ill judged" actions, making human factors a major contributing factor.

Recognition
In 2008, Toptunov was posthumously awarded with the 3rd degree Order For Courage by Viktor Yushchenko, then the President of Ukraine.

He was portrayed by actor Volodya Stepanenko in the 2004 Zero Hour TV series. He was portrayed by Michael Colgan in the 2006 BBC production Surviving Disaster: Chernobyl Nuclear Disaster and by Robert Emms in the 2019 HBO miniseries Chernobyl.

See also
Deaths due to the Chernobyl disaster

References

1960 births
1986 deaths
People from Sumy Oblast
20th-century Ukrainian engineers
Soviet engineers
People associated with the Chernobyl disaster
Chernobyl liquidators
Recipients of the Order For Courage, 3rd class
Victims of radiological poisoning
Obninsk Institute for Nuclear Power Engineering alumni